Robert Kerr Williamson (8 December 1932 – 17 September 2019), known as Roy Williamson, was the seventh Bishop of Bradford from 1984 until 1991, who was then translated to Southwark where he served until his retirement seven years later.

Williamson was born in Belfast and educated at Kingston Polytechnic and Oak Hill Theological College. His first post after ordination was as a curate at Crowborough Parish Church. He then held incumbencies at St Paul, Hyson Green, Nottingham and St Ann with Emmanuel, in the same city before being appointed Archdeacon of Nottingham in 1978, his last post before elevation to the episcopate.

On 11 February 2017, Williamson was one of fourteen retired bishops to sign an open letter to the then-serving bishops of the Church of England. In an unprecedented move, they expressed their opposition to the House of Bishops' report to General Synod on sexuality, which recommended no change to the Church's canons or practices around sexuality. By 13 February, a serving bishop (Alan Wilson, Bishop of Buckingham) and nine further retired bishops had added their signatures; on 15 February, the report was rejected by synod.

He died on 17 September 2019 at the age of 86.

References

1932 births
Clergy from Belfast
2019 deaths
Archdeacons of Nottingham
Bishops of Bradford (diocese)
Bishops of Southwark
20th-century Church of England bishops